GOTHAM SCREEN is an American cinematic event which became the newest addition to New York City's film festival scene.

After its debut in 2007 as a screenplay contest, Gotham Screen, or GSIFF International Film Festival, has been expanded to showcase shorts and feature films. 2012's festival took place in downtown Manhattan, at the Quad Cinema, from October 4–14.

This festival gives filmmakers the chance to have their work shown and critically judged in New York. Gotham Screen specializes in fresh voices and perspectives from local, national and international filmmakers. The mission of the festival is to create a positive industry and audience exposure for works that would otherwise not easily get seen. The concurrently held screenplay contest also holds regular readings throughout the year.

The festival's International Showcase will this year host a selection of European, Middle Eastern and Asian feature films, shorts and documentaries, while the New American Cinema section brings the latest in US shorts and independents.

About the festival 
The GOTHAM SCREEN film festival showcases new feature, documentary and short films from independent, first- or second-time directors as well as international releases making their East Coast or US debut. The festival focuses on new names and lesser known filmmaking regions. There is a $1,000 cash prize for Best Short Film.

The GOTHAM SCREEN Screenplay Contest is aimed at first and second time screenwriters and comes with a $2,500 cash prize for the winning screenplay. In addition, excerpts from selected contest entries will be performed live at a staged reading during the festival.

The 2012 Festival and Screenplay Contest was held in Manhattan from October 4–14, 2012, at the Quad Cinema, Tribeca Grand and other venues in downtown Manhattan.

2011 Festival

2010 Festival
The 2010 Festival and Screenplay Contest was held in Manhattan from October 7–17, 2010, at the Tribeca Cinemas, Tribeca Grand and other venues in downtown Manhattan.

2010 Awards Winners
2010 GOTHAM SCREEN Circleframe Awards announced

The winning films and screenplays were announced at the industry brunch on the closing day of the 2010 Gotham Screen Film Festival, Sunday, Oct 17, 2010:

{| class="wikitable"
|-valign="top"
|Best Feature ||Just Between UsRajko Grlić, director
|-valign="top"
|Best Photography||MeatViktor Nieuwenhuijs, Cinematographer/DP
|-valign="top"
|Best Actress||Maxine Peake, The Secret Diaries of Miss Anne Lister
|-valign="top"
|Best Actor||Miki Manojlović, Just Between Us'
|-valign="top"
|Best Short Film||TapewormMargaret Laney, director
|-valign="top"
|Special Jury Mention - Acting in A Short Film||TapewormMadeleine Lodge, actress
|-valign="top"
|Special Jury Mention - Student Film||The Birds UpstairsChristopher Jarvis, director
|-valign="top"
|Special Jury Mention - Short Film Experiment||Somewhere Never TraveledBen Garchar, director
|}

2010 GOTHAM SCREEN Circleframe Screenwriting Awards

 Festival lineup 2010 
The 2010 festival lineup:

 Festival lineup 2009 

The 2009 Festival and Screenplay Contest was held in Manhattan from October 20–25, 2009.

The highlights of the 2008 lineup:

Opening Night Premiere: Loft (2008 film) Belgium 2008 - Thursday, October 21, 8:30pm
A sexy Belgian thriller, starring Koen De Bouw, Filip Peeters, Matthias Schoenaerts, Veerle Baetens, Laura Verlinden and An Miller; Dir.: Erik Van Looy. U.S. Premiere.

Closing Night Premiere: The Understudy (2008 film) US 2008- Sunday, October 25, 7:30pm
A cool New York comedy, starring Marin Ireland, Paul Sparks, Aasif Mandvi, Richard Kind, Tom Wopat, Gloria Reuben, Reiko Aylesworth; Dir: David Conolly & Hannah Davis. New York Premiere.

Special Screening:  The Belgrade Phantom, Serbia 2008- Saturday, October 24, 9pm
A “Fast and Furious’ for the Socialist era” at the end of the 70s,  starring Milutin Milošević, Radoslav Milenković, Marko Živić, Nada Macankovic; Dir: Jovan Todorović. U.S. Premiere.

Live Staged Reading: Tuesday, October 20, 7:30pm
A selection of excerpts from finalists for the Circleframe Award of the
Gotham Screen screenplay contest are performed live on stage. Free Event.

2009 Awards Winners
2009 GOTHAM SCREEN Circleframe Awards announced

The winning films and screenplays were announced on the closing day of the 2009 Gotham Screen Film Festival, Sunday, Oct 25, 2009:

2009 GOTHAM SCREEN Circleframe Screenwriting Awards

 Festival lineup 2008 
Opening Night PremiereLeft Bank Linkeroever Belgium 2008 - Thursday, October 30th, 7pm
starring Eline Kuppens, Matthias Schoenaerts, Marilou Mermans; Dir: Pieter Van Hees

Closing Night PremierePretty Ugly People US 2008- Sunday, November 2nd, 7:30pm
starring Missi Pyle, Melissa McCarthy, Josh Hopkins, Octavia Spencer, Dir: Tate Taylor

Special ScreeningHow To Be'' UK 2008- Saturday, November 1st, 9pm
starring Robert Pattinson, Rebecca Pidgeon, Jeremy Hardy; Dir: Oliver Irving

2008 Awards Winners
2008 GOTHAM SCREEN Circleframe Awards announced

The winning films and screenplays were announced on the closing day of the 2008 Gotham Screen Film Festival, Sunday, Nov 2, 2008:

2008 GOTHAM SCREEN Circleframe Screenwriting Awards

References

External links
 Gotham Screen Film Festival
 Moving Pictures Magazine
 Filmfestivalpost
 Filmfestivals.com Festival Guide

Film festivals in New York City
Film festivals established in 2007
Festivals in Manhattan